Britannia Hotels is a British hotel group with 63 hotels in Great Britain. Britannia operates at the budget end of the market, and includes the Pontins Holiday Park portfolio. In recent years, Britannia Hotels has been a subject of widespread criticism over the hygiene and maintenance of its locations, with the consumer group Which? declaring the hotel chain to be the worst in the United Kingdom since October 2013: the controversies have contributed towards the growing general perception of Britannia Hotels as "Britain's worst hotel chain".

Overview

Britannia Hotels was founded in 1976 with the purchase of the Britannia Country House Hotel in Didsbury, Manchester. Its Chief Executive, founder, and largest shareholder remains Alex Langsam.  Langsam is a non-domiciled taxpayer, registered as living in Austria for tax-purposes since 1999. His net personal worth was valued at £90 million in 2013 by The Sunday Times.

Its head office is based in the old town hall in Hale, Manchester. A large cluster of the company's hotels are located in and around Manchester.

Soon after its foundation Britannia began making a number of further acquisitions. The second purchase in 1981 was a derelict listed building in central Manchester (the former Watts Warehouse standing on Portland Street, Manchester). After redeveloping the unit it opened in May 1982 as the Britannia Hotel Manchester. At the end of 1982 British Rail sold off its hotel division, British Transport Hotels. From this sale, in 1983 Britannia bought the Britannia Adelphi Hotel in Liverpool. 

In 1987 Britannia Hotels converted an unused building in Manchester that had been the city's C&A department store - this became the Sachas Hotel. Later in the same year Bosworth Hall, a country house style hotel in Market Bosworth Leicestershire, was purchased. Bosworth Hall was being converted from a hospital/nursing home into a hotel and Britannia took over the development from the builders who went bankrupt. In 1988 the company purchased and began development of the International Hotel adjacent to Canary Wharf in the London's Docklands. The hotel opened on 9 June 1992. A year later, Britannia took over a 187-bedroom hotel in Stockport. After a period of refurbishment the Britannia Stockport Hotel opened in 1993. In the summer of the same year the group also purchased the Europa Hotel situated close to Gatwick Airport.

In the following 10 years the group acquired 16 more hotels in locations such as Birmingham, Aberdeen and Newcastle. In November 2004 it acquired four hotels from the Grand Leisure Group: the Grand Hotel in Scarborough, the Grand Hotel in Llandudno, the Grand Burstin Hotel in Folkestone and the Grand Metropole in Blackpool. In January 2011, the company bought North West holiday camp business Pontins out of administration in an £18.5m deal which safeguarded about 1,000 jobs. Following the acquisition Britannia had to deal with a series of complaints.

From 2005 to 2015 the Group enjoyed its most rapid period of expansion acquiring 23 hotels - including the Palace Hotel in Buxton and the Basingstoke Country Hotel acquired from the Hotel Collection and the Trecarn Hotel Torquay and Cavendish Hotel in Eastbourne. In 2016, Britannia Hotels also purchased The Bromsgrove Hotel & Spa which was previously owned and operated by Hilton. Later in 2017, Britannia Hotels also acquired the Royal Hotel in Hull from the Mercure Hotel Group expanding the empire to 53 Hotels.

Britannia Hotels also purchased 9 hotels between 2017 and 2021, when it acquired The Grand Hotel Gosforth Park (formerly Marriott) in Newcastle, The Grand Hotel Sunderland (formerly Marriott), The Grand Hotel Blackpool (formerly Hilton), The Meon Valley Hotel & Country Club near Southampton, The Sprowston Manor Hotel & Country Club near Norwich, The Hollins Hall Hotel & Country Club near Bradford, The Coylumbridge Hotel (formerly Hilton) in Aviemore and The Royal Clifton Hotel in Southport. This takes the number of hotels part of the Britannia group to 61.

List of properties 

On 22 December 2022, Britannia Hotels operated 63 hotels, all of which were within Great Britain:

Events

The 1988 Philip Saville film The Fruit Machine featured interior and main entrance scenes of the Adelphi Hotel in Liverpool, including a vertical pan shot past the lit marquee at night.

In 2008 as part of the Capital of Culture celebrations, a musical based on the Adelphi Hotel, written and directed by Phil Willmott, Once Upon A Time At The Adelphi, ran at the Liverpool Playhouse from 30 June until 2 August.

Controversies 

Britannia Hotels has been subject to widespread criticism on many issues, most notably in hygiene and maintenance. In November 2022, consumer group Which? declared Britannia Hotels to be the worst hotel chain in the United Kingdom for the tenth consecutive year, in last place with an overall score of 56%. Britannia Hotels had been last place in the Which? hotel chain rankings since October 2013, when the editor Richard Headland warned that other chains (such as Premier Inn) were undercutting Britannia with better service at similar prices.

Hygiene and maintenance issues 

In 2005 and 2006 the Grand Hotel in Scarborough and the Britannia Adelphi were investigated by the BBC over theft and hygiene. In November 2014, an undercover investigation by the Liverpool Echo found issues with the upkeep of both the exterior and interior of the Adelphi, warning that the ageing interiors and basic service placed Britannia Hotels at a disadvantage in the fast-evolving "cut-throat" tourism industry. In 2019, Which? journalists found the Britannia Lodge near Gatwick airport to be in a worse condition, reporting smells of damp because of a clogged ventilation fan, a bathroom affected by mould, and stains revealed under ultraviolet light. In the following year, Which? reported that the situation had not improved, despite the COVID-19 pandemic and the renewed interest in luxury hotels for staycations.

Hotel research and booking site Oyster.com has reviewed a number of Britannia Hotels. The website commended most of the reviewed locations for their proximity to city centres or public transport hubs and efforts to renovate some rooms in the Manchester location, but raised concerns about outdated interiors, inconsistent maintenance, and Wi-Fi access fees, the latter generally considered inappropriate in a country where internet access is a major part of daily life.

Planning issues 

In the mid-1980s, Alex Langsam acquired the Grade II* listed London Road Fire Station in Manchester for the group. Proposals to redevelop it into a hotel and offices were delayed and in 2006 it was placed on English Heritage's register of "at risk" historical buildings. The city council's attempt to compulsorily purchase the building was rejected on 29 November 2011. In 2015 Britannia sold the building to Allied London who began redevelopment as a mixed-use leisure and hotel facility.

Social issues 

Amid increasing pressure on Britannia Hotels over poor cleanliness, the Home Office temporarily rented rooms in three Britannia locations (two in Bournemouth, one in Folkestone) to house asylum seekers because of overcrowding at the detention centres. The Home Office also rented rooms for new refugees who were waiting for long-term housing.

In December 2018, the Britannia Royal at Kingston upon Hull cancelled a charity reservation for rough sleepers on Christmas Eve and Christmas Day without giving a reason. The incident led to a significant escalation of general criticism against Britannia Hotels, who then temporarily removed their presence from social media.

Evictions and sackings in response to COVID-19

In March 2020, Britannia Hotels attracted widespread condemnation for their response to the coronavirus pandemic: on 19 March, the Coylumbridge Aviemore Hotel sacked and evicted approximately thirty staff without notice or redundancy pay, leaving several homeless as a result of living in the hotel as part of their jobs. Britannia Hotels later reversed the decision under widespread political and public pressure, but claimed that the sackings were due to an “administrative error”. A similar incident also occurred at the Britannia-owned Pontins holiday parks, where many employees were living there as part of their jobs.

On 24 March, Manchester City Council reported that Britannia Hotels evicted homeless people from Britannia's two city centre hotels (Britannia Manchester and Sachas Hotel), despite the central government allowing hotels to continue accommodating health workers and homeless people.

Legal issues 

In September 2007, Manchester Crown Court fined Britannia Hotels £39,486 for food hygiene offences at the Britannia Hotel in Stockport, shortly after TripAdvisor rated it as one of Britain's dirtiest hotels. In December 2014, Magistrates at the Nuneaton Justice Centre fined Britannia Hotels £25,400 for food hygiene offences at the Royal Court Hotel in Coventry.

Britannia Hotels was prosecuted for breaking health and safety laws after a student drowned at the Adelphi. In November 2015, the Liverpool Echo investigated a guest's complaints about the Adelphi. In June 2017, the Adelphi was prosecuted for breaches of food safety and hygiene regulations. Further issues with the Adelphi have been reported since.  The Liverpool Echo visited the company's headquarters in June 2019 to interview a spokesperson about the complaints, but no-one would see them.

In 2013 in Canterbury Crown Court the chain was ordered to pay £200,000 in fines and costs for putting guests and construction workers at risk of exposure to asbestos at the Grand Burstin Hotel in Folkestone.

In 2021, the chain was fined £86,000 after an employee fell through rusted railings and suffered life-changing injuries at the Prince of Wales Hotel in Southport. Sefton Council also issued an improvement notice after no attempt was made to make the area safe after the accident occurred.

On 10 September 2022, a 21 year old woman was crushed to death by a wardrobe whilst staying at the Britannia Adelphi hotel.

See also

References

External links

Hotel chains in the United Kingdom
Companies based in Trafford